Eaudevie is an extinct town in southern Christian County, in the U.S. state of Missouri. U.S. 65 passes two miles west of the location.

A post office was established at Eaudevie in 1904, and remained in operation until 1929. Eaudevie was established as a spa, with its name a translation from the French language, meaning "water of life".

References

Ghost towns in Missouri
Former populated places in Christian County, Missouri